Vamsi K. Mootha  is an Indian-born American physician-scientist and computational biologist. He is an Investigator of the Howard Hughes Medical Institute, Professor of Systems Biology and Medicine at Harvard Medical School, Investigator in the Department of Molecular Biology at Massachusetts General Hospital. He is also an Institute Member of the Broad Institute.

Mootha and his research group have made major contributions to mitochondrial biology and genomics.  His group characterized the mammalian mitochondrial proteome and has produced a widely utilized resource called MitoCarta. Working with clinical collaborators, his team used the inventory to identify a very large number of mitochondrial disease genes.  Mootha and his team used “integrative genomics” to identify all of the molecular components of the mitochondrial calcium uniporter, a key channel of communication between the organelle and the rest of the cell.  He and his team used genomics to make the unexpected discovery that in animal models, low oxygen can alleviate mitochondrial disease.  As a postdoctoral fellow he developed Gene Set Enrichment Analysis, an algorithm that is widely used in genomics and has been implemented into a popular software tool.

He is a  2004 recipient of the Macarthur Foundation "genius award".  He received the 2008 Daland Prize from the American Philosophical Society, the 2014 Keilin Medal from the Biochemical Society, and a 2014 Padma Shri Award from the Republic of India, the fourth highest civilian award given by the Indian government.  He was elected to the United States National Academy of Sciences in 2014 and the National Academy of Medicine in 2021.

Mootha graduated from Kelly High School in Beaumont, Texas. As a high school student he won first place in the mathematics category of the International Science and Engineering Fair.  He received his BS in Mathematical and Computational Science from Stanford University and his M.D. from Harvard University in the Harvard-MIT Division of Health Sciences and Technology.  He completed his internship and residency in internal medicine at Brigham and Women's Hospital in Boston, and then pursued postdoctoral training with Eric Lander at the Whitehead Institute/MIT Center for Genome Research.

References

Living people
Telugu people
MacArthur Fellows
American people of Telugu descent
Systems biologists
Stanford University alumni
Harvard Medical School alumni
American people of Indian descent
Harvard Medical School faculty
People from Beaumont, Texas
Howard Hughes Medical Investigators
Scientists from Andhra Pradesh
Massachusetts General Hospital faculty
Recipients of the Padma Shri in medicine
People from Kakinada
Members of the United States National Academy of Sciences
Year of birth missing (living people)
Members of the National Academy of Medicine